A referendum on making Ossetian and Russian official languages was held in South Ossetia on 13 November 2011, alongside presidential elections. The referendum was originally scheduled for 11 September 2011, but on 12 August the decision was made to postpone it.

Prior to the referendum the first section of the fourth article of the constitution states that Ossetian is the national language in South Ossetia, while the second section states that Russian (together with Ossetian and, in certain cases, Georgian) is the official language of government bodies, state administration and local self-government.

Results

References

2011 referendums
2011 in Georgia (country)
Language policy in Russia
Referendums in South Ossetia
2011 in South Ossetia
Language referendums